is a Japanese model and tarento represented by Oscar Promotion. Her father is Japanese, while her mother is Italian-American.

Filmography

Magazines

TV series
Current appearances

Former appearances

Dramas

Films

Music videos

Advertisements

References

External links
 

Japanese female models
Japanese entertainers
Japanese people of American descent
Japanese people of Italian descent
The Putney School alumni
1982 births
Living people
Actresses from Tokyo
Models from Tokyo Metropolis